Pleocoma is the only extant genus of rain beetles (family Pleocomidae) and is endemic to the Pacific states of North America. Fossil remains of Pleocoma have been found in the Yixian Formation in China, suggesting beetles in this genus have existed in something like their present form since at least the Cretaceous period. There are 27 described species in Pleocoma.

The back is hairless and glossy. Overall colors range from black to a reddish-brown, while the hairs may range from yellow to red to black. The antennae are 11-segmented, with a club of four to eight lamellae, more than in any other group of the Scarabaeoidea. The mandibles are not functional, and the opening into the esophagus is closed off; adults do not eat.

Larvae have the typical scarabaeiform characteristics, C-shaped bodies generally a creamy white. They feed on roots in the soil, often deep beneath the host plant. Details of the larval stage are only known for some species; they have nine or more instars, and may take up to 13 years to mature. After a late summer pupation, adults of both sexes dig their way to the surface, emerging around the onset of the fall/winter rainy season typical of, for instance, California's climate; some species are active as late as early spring. Females have only vestigial wings, so the males fly around (often while it is raining), homing in on pheromones released by the females. They mate on the surface or in a burrow dug out by the female, then the female lays eggs in the bottom of the burrow. The "triggering" conditions required for some species to fly are so stringent that a given population may only be active for a single day in a given year. Males are commonly attracted to bright lights.

Species

Fossil Species
 †Pleocoma dolichophylla Nikolajev & Ren, 2012

References

Further reading

 
 
 
 
 

Scarabaeoidea genera